It's Tough to Be Famous is a 1932 American pre-Code comedy film directed by Alfred E. Green and written by Robert Lord. The film stars Douglas Fairbanks, Jr., Mary Brian, Emma Dunn, Walter Catlett and David Landau. The film was released by Warner Bros. on April 2, 1932.

Plot

When his submarine, S89, is sunk by an excursion boat, Scotty (Douglas Fairbanks, Jr.) is the last one left aboard after helping the crew to be rescued. However, navy divers are able to save Scotty and his heroics make him a hero. Retiring from the navy as a commander, he finds that, as a hero, he is in great demand. There are parades. Speeches, endorsements, banquets and autographs galore. Even his marriage to his sweetheart Janet (Mary Brian) is headline news. Everyone wants a piece of Scotty. The only thing that Scotty does not have in his freedom and a life of his own.

Cast    
 Douglas Fairbanks, Jr. as Scott 'Scotty' McClenahan
 Mary Brian as Janet Porter McClenahan
 Harold Minjir as Sutter
 Emma Dunn as 'Moms' McClenahan
 Walter Catlett as Joseph Craig 'Joe' Chapin
 David Landau as Chief Petty Officer Steve Stevens
 Oscar Apfel as S.J. Boynton
 J. Carrol Naish as Lt. Blake 
 Louise Beavers as Ada
 Lilian Bond as Edna Jackson

References

External links 

 
 
 
 

1932 films
1932 comedy films
American comedy films
American black-and-white films
Films based on American novels
Films directed by Alfred E. Green
First National Pictures films
Warner Bros. films
1930s English-language films
1930s American films